"Come Take My Hand" is a song by Dutch Eurodance group 2 Brothers on the 4th Floor featuring rapper D-Rock and singer Des'Ray. It was released in 1995 as the second single from their second album, 2 (1996), and was a sizeable hit in Europe. The song reached number four in the Netherlands, number nine in Belgium and number 12 in Norway. On the Eurochart Hot 100, "Come Take My Hand" peaked at number 47 in October 1995. Outside Europe, it reached number-one in Israel. A black-and-white music video was shot to accompany it. In 2015, the song was released in the Netherlands in a new remix by The Viper (aka Melvin Pelupessy).

Critical reception
Maria Jimenez from Pan-European magazine Music & Media described "Come Take My hand" as a "melodious spin on Euro happy hardbeat".

Music video
The accompanying music video for the song takes place in a desert-like setting. A bus arrives and Des'Ray and D-Rock get off it. Standing out in the desert, Des'Ray begins to sing. Throughout the video, various people appear, or pass by, like a man in a motorcycle suit and helmet, a woman with flowers, a clown, a man and woman with a child, watering the desert, an indian and a farmer with a mustache, standing by a cow. As D-Rock begins to rap, a data animated, mechanical microphone unfolds in front of him. A man, dressed in baroque fashion puts a headset on the head of the rapper, while a data animated bird shows up and flies away. The man with the mustache reveals that his mustache is a fake one. In the end, the bus reappears. Des'Ray and D-Rock enter and the bus leaves.

Track listing
 12", Netherlands (1995)
"Come Take My Hand" (Beats 'R Us Mix) – 7:57
"Come Take My Hand" (Euro Trance Trip) – 5:13
"Come Take My Hand" (Extended Version) – 5:10
"Come Take My Hand" (K&A's Extended Rave Blast) – 5:50

 CD single, Netherlands (1995)
"Come Take My Hand" (Radio Version) – 4:02
"Come Take My Hand" (Cooly's Jungle Mix) – 5:25

 CD maxi, Netherlands (1995)
"Come Take My Hand" (Radio Version) – 4:02
"Come Take My Hand" (Extended Version) – 5:10
"Come Take My Hand" (Cooly's Jungle Mix) – 5:25
"Come Take My Hand" (Beats R Us Mix) – 7:57
"Come Take My Hand" (K&A's Happy Hardcore Blast) – 5:38
"Come Take My Hand" (K&A's Extended Rave Blast) – 5:50
"Come Take My Hand" (Lick Mix) – 5:04
"Come Take My Hand" (Euro Trance Trip) – 5:13

Charts

Weekly charts

Year-end charts

References

1995 singles
1995 songs
2 Brothers on the 4th Floor songs
Black-and-white music videos
CNR Music singles
Electro songs
English-language Dutch songs
Number-one singles in Israel